The Institute for Sales and Account Management (ISAM) is a Dutch knowledge institute that was founded in 1996 as part of the Erasmus University Rotterdam. ISAM conducts research in the field of neuroeconomics; a science in which economics, psychology, and neuroscience are combined.

Serving as an example is the research into the brain activity of salespeople, which can be detected through the use of fMRI scans. Functional Magnetic Resonance Imaging (fMRI) is a technique that can trace the location in the brains where someone is processing information at the moment that he or she is faced with a stimulus (e.g. interaction with a client). Thus, with the help of an fMRI scanner both the conscious as well as the unconscious brain processes can be traced. This study has been realized in cooperation with the Erasmus MC (medical center) and the University of Michigan. It has been published in the Journal of Marketing Research.

All knowledge that is acquired through ISAM research, is transferred to the (inter)national business world by means of postgraduate education programmes in the field of sales and account management.

External links 
 Website ISAM
 Website ISAM NeuroScience

Research institutes in the Netherlands
Economic research institutes
1996 establishments in the Netherlands